Lesbian, gay, bisexual, and transgender (LGBT) people in Ethiopia face legal challenges not experienced by non-LGBT residents. Both male and female same-sex sexual activity is illegal in the country, with reports of high levels of discrimination and abuses against LGBT people.  

Ethiopia has a long history of social conservatism and same-sex activity is considered a minor phenomenon. 

However the majority of Ethiopians remain hostile towards LGBT and believe it to be a "Western perversion of their societal values". Homosexual men are widely blamed for claimed HIV/AIDS epidemic in Ethiopia. Discrimination and stigma are therefore commonplace and some Ethiopian LGBT people suppress their identity or flee as asylum seekers. According to the 2007 Pew Global Attitudes Project, 97 percent of Ethiopians believe homosexuality is a way of life that society should not accept. This was the second-highest rate of non-acceptance in the 45 countries surveyed.

Gay and lesbian people do not openly serve in the army despite the lack of a law regarding service in the military. Booshtee is a derogatory term of gay person in Ethiopia, often interchangeably used as an insult for despicable being.

History
Notable reference of same-sex activity in Ethiopia was in hagiography The Life and Struggles of Our Mother Wälättä P̣eṭros (1672). Walatta Petros (1592–1642) and her fellow student Ehete Krestos from Ethiopian Orthodox Tewahedo Church, were friendly nuns "lived together in mutual love, like soul and body" until death whereas other nuns depicted as lustful each other. The book is the first requiring in "queer reading" style in earliest Ethiopian literature.

In 2008, LGBT people became increasingly visible in Ethiopia when hundreds of homosexuals petitioned for equal rights and appealed to the prime minister Meles Zenawi. However it became blocked en route to the prime minister's office. In the same year, an unofficial gay marriage took place in Sheraton Addis. In the early 2010s, some media outlets with the cooperation of the government imposed restrictions over the discussion of "LGBT ideology". These policies of censorship have yet to be enacted into law.

Gender roles in Maale culture

Donald Donham suggested that a small minority of  Maales who are apparently male occasionally adopt feminine societal roles, donning typically female attire and occasionally having sex with men.

Legality of same-sex sexual activity

Under Article 629 of the Criminal Code, both male and female same-sex sexual activity is illegal in Ethiopia. The penal code states:
Whoever performs with another person of the same sex a homosexual act, or any other indecent act, is punishable with simple imprisonment.
 
The Article 630 defines the punishments into two ways:
 
1. The punishment shall be imprisonment for not less than one year, or, in certain grave cases, rigorous imprisonment not exceeding ten years.

2. The punishment shall be rigorous imprisonment from three years to fifteen years.

Homosexual and other indecent acts performed on minors
In Article 631, homosexuality performed on minors is punishable:

1.  From 3-5 years; where the victim is between 13-18 years old

2.  From 15-25; where the victim is below thirteen years old

3.  A woman performs homosexual acts with minor of the same sex is punishable with not exceeding ten years

4.  Indecent acts performed on minor of same-sex shall be punished with simple imprisonment.

5.  If the victim is pupil, apprentice, child entrusted while in custody shall be aggravated than crime that he commits.

6.  It will be rigorous imprisonment from 3-10 years

In Ethiopian law, the wording of the penal code treats a homosexual act as an act of an aggressor against a victim. Consequently, the offense of the aggressor is considered aggravated, when it results in the suicide of the victim for reasons of "shame, distress or despair".

Traditional attitudes around sex and sexuality are prevalent in Ethiopia, with many Ethiopians holding that homosexuality is a choice and not innate. Arguments are made of it being an import from the West and that Ethiopian society should not accept it as a legitimate orientation. A 2007 Pew Global Attitudes Project found 97% of Ethiopian residents said that homosexuality should be rejected by society. This was the second-highest percentage among the countries surveyed, exceeded only by Mali.

Dr Seyoum Antoniyos, President of United for Life and influential activist organised a national conference in 2013 attended by politicians and religious leaders. He argues that homosexuality is the result of a "deep psychological problem", often caused by abuse or some form of "social crisis".

In December 2008, nearly a dozen Ethiopian religious figures (including the leader of Ethiopian Muslims and the heads of the Orthodox, Protestant and Catholic churches) adopted a resolution against homosexuality, urging Ethiopian lawmakers to endorse a ban on homosexual activity in the constitution. This included Ethiopian Catholic Archbishop Berhaneyesus Demerew Souraphiel.

They also held homosexuality responsible for the rise in sexual attacks on children and young men. 
Abune Paulos, the patriarch of the Ethiopian Orthodox Tewahedo Church, said, "This is something very strange in Ethiopia, the land of the Bible that condemns this very strongly. For people to act in this manner they have to be dumb, stupid like animals. We strongly condemn this behaviour. They (homosexuals) have to be disciplined and their acts discriminated, they have to be given a lesson."

In March 2014, the Council of Ministers proposed a bill for LGBT rights protection, but parliament did not enact it because of public opposition.

On 26 April 2014, an anti-gay rally was organized by Christian groups. The head of the group and anti-gay activist Dereje Negash said:
Children are being raped by gay people in this country. Just yesterday we have met a woman whose boy was raped by two other men. All in all, gay acts are against health, the law, religion and our culture, so we should break the silence and create awareness about it.

The rally objective was to produce a bill on homosexuality into non-pardonable offence. After heard by parliamentary, the inquiry was reached to failure. The Ethiopian government maintains any individuals freedom of speeches, thus potentially allows the LGBT people to be secured and access propagandic movement and all encompassing human rights within the country (although Pride Parade is still illegal) –  to same-sexual activity legislation. Under the proposed law, the law will no longer be applied to prisoners charged with homosexuality. The Head of Ethiopian Human Rights Commission Tirunesh Zena declined the law and stated the law "does not really affect the LGBT community".

In April 2014, government spokesman Redwan Hussein dropped the anti-gay rally that includes homosexuality as non-pardonable offence. Redwan responded, "[Homosexuality] is not a serious crime… The government thinks the current jail term is enough."

Zim Anlem anti-gay campaign
Zim Anlem (Amharic: ዝም አንልም) is an anti-gay organisation which campaigns the government's efforts to decriminilalize homosexual acts. The campaign was originally founded around 2014 by Dereje Negash, who is affiliated with the Ethiopian Orthodox Tewahedo Church.  The movement gained publicity in 2019 after telecasting incidents of child-rape.

Living conditions

Since 2008, human rights campaigners have increasingly shown concern for the wellbeing of LGBT people in Ethiopia. According to a 2008 Human Rights Watch report, there was widespread violence against people who identified as gay, lesbian or bisexual. The US Department of State accused the Ethiopian government of unlawfully killing citizens, as well as carrying out acts of torture and arbitrary detention. According to several surveys and reports, homosexuality caused a moral panic in Ethiopian society and many Ethiopians felt "it was brought by the West to pervert society". Ethiopians who hold traditional views or are religious devotees, especially Ethiopian Orthodox Tewahedo followers and Muslims, are generally intolerant of LGBT people. This leads LGBT people to face social stigma among the broader population. Internet censorhip has limited the ability of LGBT people and their allies to organize campaigns and petitions.

In 2012, a pro-gay conference was scheduled to be held in Addis Ababa. The conference was cancelled due to pressure from fundamentalist Christians and religious groups, who protested against the conference and called its organisers "missionaries of evil".

In June 2012, an anti-gay conference was held at the headquarters of the African Union concerning the alleged "consequences of homosexuality as a causative agent for HIV/AIDS, sexually transmitted disease and several psychological disorders".

2019 anti-LGBT protests

In June 2019, a Chicago-based LGBT community, Toto Tours, announced its visit to Ethiopia, specifically to Bahir Dar and Lalibela from October. The tour incited objections from Ethiopians and the diaspora abroad, who organized protests in response. The organisation's owner Dan Ware said the controversy began in May 2019 when the group posted plans on social media. On 8 September, Dereje Negash denounced "the government's indifference to helping the LGBT movement in the East African country." An anonymous LGBT activist told Associated Press of his concern that there are wide misconceptions in the country that gay people may be culpable for the increasing incidence of rape.

Social status by regions
Ethiopians tend to be disapproving of homosexuality, but attitudes vary by regions depending on the local cultural norms. Opposition is generally greater in predominantly Christian regions such as among the Habesha people of the Ethiopian highlands. This is because of the historical influence of the Ethiopian Orthodox Church and its teachings. Ethiopian Muslims such as the Harari, Afars and Somalis are also generally hostile to the LGBT community.

The US Department of State's 2011 Human Rights Report found that,
There were some reports of violence against lesbian, gay, bisexual, and transgender (LGBT) individuals; however, reporting was limited due to fears of retribution, discrimination, or stigmatization. Persons did not identify themselves as LGBT due to severe societal stigma and the illegality of consensual same-sex sexual activity. In early December 2011, Christian and Muslim religious leaders attempted to derail a seminar on sexual health that was targeted at men who have sex with men. The government intervened, and the seminar went ahead, although at a different location. The AIDS Resource Center in Addis Ababa reported that the majority of self-identified gay and lesbian callers, the majority of whom were male, requested assistance in changing their behavior in order to avoid discrimination. Many gay men reported anxiety, confusion, identity crises, depression, self-ostracism, religious conflict, and suicide attempts.
The same report found that stigma and discrimination toward persons living with HIV/AIDS impacted residents' ability to receive an education, find employment and integrate into the community. In 2017, the US State of Department reported that there were certain violence toward LGBT people across the community, but unable to conduct deep research due to feared discrimination and retribution.

LGBT organizations
In 2007 an LGBT group named The Ethiopian Gays, Lesbians, Bisexual & Transgender Committee was formed with the intention of campaigning for recognition and rights for LGBT people in Ethiopia.

In 2013, an LGBT advocacy group Dana Social Club was founded by Beki Abiy. The group has a goal of supporting self-stigmatized and discriminated gays and lesbians to freely express their sexual orientation and to campaign for transgender people's rights to sex reassignment surgery. The group chiefly operates via online campaigning and they maintain an archive called the Ethiopian Gay Library.

Summary table

See also

Human rights in Ethiopia
LGBT rights in Africa

References

External links
UK government travel advice for Ethiopia: Local laws and customs
Analysis of intersection of homosexuality and feminism in Ethiopia
Constitution of the Federal Democratic Republic of Ethiopia

LGBT in Ethiopia
Ethiopia
Law of Ethiopia
Human rights in Ethiopia